Darnell McIntosh (born 5 July 1997) is an English professional rugby league footballer who plays as a er or  for Hull FC in the Super League.

He has spent time on loan from Huddersfield at Oldham (Heritage № 1363) in the Kingstone Press Championship in both 2016 and 2017.

Background
McIntosh was born in Huddersfield, West Yorkshire, England.

Darnell is a product of the Giants' scholarship system  and was called up to the England Knights squad along with 3 other Giants players in 2019

Career
McIntosh spent time on loan at the Oldham in 2016.
In round 3 of the 2021 Super League season, he scored two tries for Huddersfield in a 25-24 loss against Hull Kingston Rovers.
In round 11 of the 2022 Super League season, he scored a hat-trick in Hull F.C.'s 48-12 win over Toulouse Olympique.

References

External links
Huddersfield Giants profile
SL profile

1997 births
Living people
English rugby league players
Huddersfield Giants players
Hull F.C. players
Oldham R.L.F.C. players
Rugby league fullbacks
Rugby league players from Huddersfield